Brit Awards 1984  was the fourth event of the Brit Awards, an annual pop music award ceremony in the United Kingdom. It was run by the British Phonographic Industry and took place on 21 February 1984 at Grosvenor House Hotel in London. The host for the second year running was Tim Rice.

Winners and nominees

Multiple nominations and awards
The following artists received multiple awards and/or nominations. don't counting British Album of the Year and British Single of the Year.

References

External links
1984 Brit Awards at Brits.co.uk

Brit Awards
Brit Awards
BRIT Awards
BRIT Awards
Brit Awards
Brit Awards